Susan Grabel (born 1942, Brooklyn, NY)  is an American feminist artist. She spent part of her early adulthood in Haight-Ashbury, San Francisco, where she nurtured her artistic pursuits. Grabel has described her work as being inspired by the realities of aging and the female body, and specializes in sculpture and art on paper such as collography. 

Susan got involved in art during her early college years. At the end of her sophomore year at Brooklyn College, she attended a  summer session at the University of Wisconsin in Madison in 196. She planned to take two courses to decide if she would major in English Literature or Mathematics. After two days of an Analytic Geometry and Calculus, she decided to major in English Literature. She found a sculpture course to replace the math course. "I spent day and nigh in the studio, and that was it!" When she returned to New York, she went to the Brooklyn Museum Art School and studied with Joe Konzal, Tom Doyle and Jolyon Hofsted.

Grabel's artwork has been exhibited both alone and alongside the works of other artists in the following art galleries: Artists Choice Museum (New York City), Ceres, Dartmouth College (NH), Denise Bibro Gallery, Monmouth Museum (NJ), Newhouse Center for Contemporary Art (Staten Island, NY), Pratt Institute Gallery, Prince Street Gallery, Soho20 Chelsea, Staten Island Museum, and the Urban Institute for Contemporary Arts (MI).
She is married to the noted American History Professor George Rappaport, and is the cousin of Dr. Charles Kelman, inventor of phacoemulsification.

Here is the list of some other exhibits

References

External links
Official website

American women artists
Feminist artists
Living people
American artists
21st-century American women
1942 births